God's Own Medicine is the debut studio album by the English gothic rock band The Mission. It was released in November 1986 under Mercury Records. The original LP version contains 10 songs. The CD and cassette versions had the songs "Blood Brother" and "Island in the Stream" added. Both had previously appeared on the "III" (Stay With Me) single.

Background 

The band had spent much of 1986 touring around Europe and had performed two radio broadcasts for the BBC. In the summer of that year, they signed with Phonogram Records after releasing two independent singles. Much of the material had featured on the tour and the band completed Gods Own Medicine within a period of four weeks. The record was produced by Tim Palmer and the Mission and recorded at Ridge Farm and Utopia Studios.

Three singles were released from the album, "Stay With Me", "Wasteland" and "Severina".

Track listing

Critical reception 

Writing for American publication Trouser Press, Ira Robbins described the album as a "dull and insipid guitar/keyboard/string bombast", and "a horrible amalgam of Led Zeppelin, Yes and Echo & the Bunnymen". AllMusic described it as "the marker for goth rock's invasion of the U.K. charts for a good chunk of the late '80s".

Reissue 

A remastered version appeared in June 2007 with four bonus tracks, including the original intro to "Love Me to Death" (previously available only on the "Wasteland" video-cd, and as a hidden track on the B side of the 12" single release of Severina) that had to be cut due to the time constraints of vinyl. Consequently, its insertion has not been taken into account in the track list of the remaster—listing the two tracks as "Love Me to Death (Original Full Length Version)"—and thus all tracks after eleven are mislabelled as being one track ahead of where they actually appear on the album.

It was certified gold in the UK.

Personnel

The Mission
 Craig Adams – bass guitar, production
 Mick Brown – drums, production
 Simon Hinkler – guitars, keyboards, production
 Wayne Hussey – vocals, guitars, production

Additional personnel

 Tim Palmer – production
 Julianne Regan – additional vocals
 Adam Peters – string arrangements
 The Leisure Process – sleeve design
 Sandy Ball – sleeve design
 KEV – mastering

References

External links 

 

1986 debut albums
The Mission (band) albums
Albums produced by Tim Palmer
Mercury Records albums